Mark Franklin Corey (born November 16, 1974) is a retired American baseball pitcher. He played in Major League Baseball for the New York Mets, Colorado Rockies, and Pittsburgh Pirates.

Early life
Corey attended Austin High School in Austin, Pennsylvania, where he played golf and basketball and threw javelin. He was the valedictorian of his class. As his graduating class had only 18 students, he relied on the American Legion to play baseball.

Corey played college baseball in NCAA Division II at Edinboro University of Pennsylvania for the Edinboro Fighting Scots. He was inducted into the school's athletics hall of fame in 2009.

Professional career
Corey was drafted in the fourth round of the 1995 Major League Baseball draft by the Cincinnati Reds.

He made his Major League debut in 2001 with the New York Mets. In June 2002, Corey suffered a seizure after he and Mets teammate Tony Tarasco smoked marijuana outside of Shea Stadium. Under Major League Baseball drug policy at the time, because both players were first-time offenders, they were not subject to discipline from the league.

In 2004, with the Columbus Clippers, the New York Yankees' Triple-A affiliate, he went 7–4 with a 4.44 ERA. Corey led Triple-A with 28 saves in 2005. He pitched in the Pittsburgh Pirates organization for their Triple-A affiliate, the Indianapolis Indians, in 2007. At the time of his retirement, he had pitched in a combined 81 major league games for the Mets, Colorado Rockies, and Pirates.

References

External links

Mark Corey's MiLB Biography

1974 births
Living people
Baseball players from Pennsylvania
Major League Baseball pitchers
Colorado Rockies players
New York Mets players
Pittsburgh Pirates players
Binghamton Mets players
Burlington Bees players
Central Arizona Vaqueros baseball players
Charleston AlleyCats players
Chattanooga Lookouts players
Columbus Clippers players
Edinboro Fighting Scots baseball players
Indianapolis Indians players
Princeton Reds players
Nashville Sounds players
Norfolk Tides players
St. Lucie Mets players